The single station Terreros - Hospital C.V. is part of the massive transport system Bogotá, TransMilenio, opened in the year 2000.

Location 
The station is located in the northeast-central sector of Soacha, specifically on the  Autopista Sur with Calle 35. In its vicinity are the general police command of Soacha and the cardiovascular hospital of which also takes its first name. It also serves the demand of San Mateo, Rincón de Santa Fe, El Trébol and its environs.

History 
The inauguration of the station was delayed due to delays in the construction of phase I in Soacha. The August 4 A new car was put into operation on the south side of the pedestrian bridge that gives access to the station to expand the capacity of the station.

Etymology 
The first name of the station is in direct allusion to a hacienda declared historical heritage of Soacha and by the Avenida Terreros that passes close to the station. Your middle name Takes it from the child's cardiovascular hospital located 700 meters from the station, the station is located in the wide sector of San Mateo, making the Avenue one of the main entrances to the San Mateo neighborhood.

Service Station

Main Services

Cable 
The station will have an aerial cable system similar to the Metrocable of the city of Medellín, this Metrocable will have four stations and will cover about 25 districts of the municipality of Soacha.

References

External links 
 TransMilenio
 www.surumbo.com official interactive query system TransMilenio maps

TransMilenio